Storm Warning is a 1951 American film noir thriller directed by Stuart Heisler and starring Ginger Rogers, Ronald Reagan, Doris Day and Steve Cochran. Lauren Bacall was originally cast in the part eventually played by Rogers. Bacall turned it down and was put on suspension by Warner Bros. for her defiance.

Plot
Marsha Mitchell (Ginger Rogers), a traveling dress model, stops in the town of Rock Point to see her newlywed sister, Lucy Rice (Doris Day). Within minutes of entering the town she notices unusual behavior by the townsfolk, such as dozens of people closing up shop and getting out of sight. As she walks down the almost-pitch-black main street, she hears loud noises coming from the police station. She hides and witnesses a drunken KKK mob, lynching a man whom they had just broken out of jail. The man untangles himself from their clutches and only manages to run two or three yards before getting cut down by shotgun blasts, striking him in the torso and the head. The mob, slightly apprehensive, approaches the fallen man, arguing among themselves. Marsha gets a good look at two of the men, who have removed their hoods during the violence.

After the mob quickly leaves the scene, Marsha runs to the nearby bowling alley, where her sister works. Lucy quickly notices the shocked and horrified look on her sister's face and inquires. Marsha tells her about the murder she just witnessed, which causes Lucy to tell her about the undercover work of Walter Adams, who, she believes, must have been the slain man. She explains that Adams arrived in town recently and got a job with the phone company, but he was secretly a journalist, writing critical material about the town's klavern. The police decided to put an end to his reporting and arrested him on a false charge of driving while intoxicated.

Lucy takes Marsha to her home and encourages her to tell her husband, Hank, about what Marsha saw. However, there is a problem: As soon as Marsha meets Hank, she recognizes him as one of the two men who removed their hoods. Within minutes, while Marsha and Lucy are alone (at least she thinks they are alone), Marsha tells her sister that her husband was one of the Klansmen. Hank, eavesdropping, with a clear look of guilt on his face, denies everything. However, he's not able to hold his own against Marsha's insistence, so he confesses. He sobs and says that he was drunk and was forced to go with the other men to the scene, and did not intend for the man to die. All they wanted to do, according to Hank, was to talk to the guy and persuade him to leave and to stop criticizing their town. Hank then desperately tries to persuade Marsha to keep her mouth shut for the sake of his life and his marriage to her sister, who is pregnant. Lucy forgives her husband and decides that he was simply a part of something beyond his control. Marsha, still viewing him as a vile person, reluctantly agrees to leave town and "forget" about the incident.

District Attorney Burt Rainey (Ronald Reagan) arrives at the murder scene and asks the police about how they could let a mob break through their doors and kidnap one of their prisoners, reminding them of their duty to protect the inmates. They claimed that they were simply outnumbered; Rainey, however, feels skeptical of that excuse, and he suggests that they were accomplices. He then arrives at the bowling alley and questions Charlie Barr (Hugh Sanders), the Imperial Wizard of the town's KKK, but he gets no answer. He then learns about Marsha and requires her to meet him in his office the next morning. Many townsfolk try to dissuade Rainey from investigating the case, for fear of his destroying the town's reputation and economy.

At Rainey's office he questions Marsha and gets a half-truth – that she saw Klansmen but did not get a look at their faces because of their hoods. Rainey feels satisfied, and he believes that the mere fact of her having seen Klansmen is enough to bring them down. He hands her a subpoena for the inquest, which will take place that afternoon. Under pressure from both her sister and the Klansmen, she decides to lie in court, allowing the coroner's jury to decide that Adams died at the hands of one or more assailants unknown.

The KKK, along with the sympathetic locals, celebrates at the bowling alley, while berating those against them. Disgusted with herself, Marsha packs up her stuff at Lucy's house so that she can leave town. However, Hank, drunk, arrives home and corners her, asking her repeatedly why she dislikes him. He then becomes violent and tries to rape her, but Lucy arrives and interrupts. Lucy finally denounces him, then Marsha tells him that she has rethought her testimony, and that she will turn him in to Rainey and the police. Furious, he kidnaps her and takes her to the KKK rally, where a functionary starts to whip Marsha until Lucy, Rainey, and the police arrive. Barr orders his men to hide Marsha and keep her quiet. While Rainey stands before Barr, the latter threatens him and tells him to leave. Rainey ignores him and snoops around, finding Marsha, weeping, in the custody of a couple of Klansmen. He then confronts Barr and demands answers. Desperate, Barr names Hank as the murderer. Hank, stealing a sidearm from one of the Klansmen, shouts in fury, condemning everyone, and he shoots his wife, then a cop shoots Hank with an automatic weapon, killing him. Scared and disillusioned, the rest of the Klansmen, many of whom drop their costumes, flee the scene, leaving Barr, the grand wizard, to fend for himself. The police arrest Barr, and the film ends with Lucy's dying in Marsha's arms and Rainey's comforting Marsha.

Cast
 Ginger Rogers as Marsha Mitchell
 Ronald Reagan as Burt Rainey
 Doris Day as Lucy Rice
 Steve Cochran as Hank Rice
 Lloyd Gough as Rummel
 Hugh Sanders as Barr
Dale Van Sickel as Walter Adams (the victim)

Reception

Critical response
Bosley Crowther of the New York Times was disappointed with the screenplay:     That passion for social crusading which the Warners showed years ago with such forthright and angry pictures as 'Black Legion' and 'They Won't Forget' flares again fitfully in 'Storm Warning,' delivered yesterday to the Strand under the imprimatur of that studio and its former producer, Jerry Wald. ... Unfortunately, an all-too-familiar conventionality of elements and plot is evident in the screen play which Daniel Fuchs and Richard Brooks have prepared. The forces opposing the prosecutor line up just as you feel they will, his key witness fails him as you figure—at first, that is—and then she falls in line when she sees how horribly and unjustly her silence permits the villains to behave. The consequence is a smoothly flowing, mechanically melodramatic film, superficially forceful but lacking real substance or depth.        Critic Dennis Schwartz believed the film trivialized the topic of bigotry.  He wrote:          A Warner Brothers social conscience film that's good on spectacle but trivializes the serious subject of race hatred with an inadequate depiction of the KKK, as it pays more attention to the melodrama than to any message. Stuart Heisler (The Glass Key/Dallas/Tulsa) tries to weave a well-intentioned anti-Klan film by working into the plot various forms of violence and intimidation the KKK exerts on a small Southern town ... It has the look and spark of the usual Warner Bros. crime drama, but delivers the public safety message that Americans won't or shouldn't tolerate in their neck of the woods a thuggish organization like the KKK (sort of like their 'crime doesn't pay' messages they leave with their formulaic bloody gangster pics). Surprisingly the racial hate message of the Klan is never touched upon. These Ku Klux Klan members seem to be only interested in keeping outsiders away from their town, dressing up in their robed costumes to act tough while in disguise and using the Klan to hide their thieving criminal activities.

References

External links
 
 
 
 
 Storm Warning information site and DVD review at DVD Beaver (includes images)
 Storm Warning  essay by Moira Finnie at Turner Classic Movies Movie Morlocks 
 Storm Warning essay by Eddie Muller at Film Noir of the Week
 

1950s thriller films
1951 films
American black-and-white films
American thriller films
Film noir
Films about the Ku Klux Klan
Films directed by Stuart Heisler
Films produced by Jerry Wald
Films scored by Daniele Amfitheatrof
Warner Bros. films
1950s English-language films
1950s American films